Revolutionary Council may refer to the:

 Revolutionary Council (Afghanistan), organ of the People's Democratic Party of Afghanistan (PDPA) from 1965 until the party's collapse in 1992
 Revolutionary Council (Algeria), the body that ruled Algeria following its 1965 coup d'état
 Revolutionary Council (Portugal), a body created by the Armed Forces Movement in 1975, disbanded in 1982
 Revolutionary Council (Zanzibar), part of the semi-autonomous Revolutionary Government of Zanzibar

It may, alternatively, refer to the:

 Armed Forces Revolutionary Council, a group of Sierra Leone soldiers that allied itself with the rebel Revolutionary United Front in the late 1990s
 Council of Islamic Revolution (Iran), a group of clerics and experts chosen to manage Iran's 1979 Islamic revolution and then legislate for its interim government
 National Patriotic Front of Liberia – Central Revolutionary Council, a rebel group that participated in the Liberian civil war
 Revolutionary Military Council, the supreme military authority of Soviet Russia
 Supreme Revolutionary Council (Madagascar), the body that ruled Madagascar from 1975
 Supreme Revolutionary Council (Somalia), the body that ruled Somalia for most of the period between 1969 and 1991
 Union Revolutionary Council, the supreme governing body of socialist Burma between 1962 and 1974

See also 
 Revolutionary committee (disambiguation)
 Revolutionary Command Council (disambiguation)
 Workers' council